This is a list of Hewitt mountains in England, Wales and Ireland by height.  Hewitts are defined as "Hills in England, Wales and Ireland over two thousand" feet  in height, the general requirement to be called a "mountain" in the British Isles, and with a prominence above ; a mix of imperial and metric thresholds.

The Hewitt classification was suggested by Alan Dawson in his 1992 book, "The Relative Hills of Britain". Dawson originally called his Hewitts "Sweats", from "Summits - Wales and England Above Two thousand", before settling on the label Hewitt. In a series of three booklets edited by Dave Hewitt, the list of English Hewitts was published in 1997, and the list of Welsh Hewitts was also published in 1997, and the list of Irish Hewitts was published in 1998. In 2010, Dawson replaced the Hewitts with Simms, a fully metric equivalent of the Hewitt, with a  height threshold and  prominence threshold, however Dawson still maintains the Hewitt list.

 there were 524 Hewitts identified, with 209 in Ireland, 180 in England, and 135 in Wales, which is 1 less than the 1997 lists of 525 Hewitts. Climbers who climb all of the Hewitts are called Hewitteers, with the first English & Welsh Hewitteer being Edward Moss on 22 July 1951.

On 5 December 2018, the BBC announced that Foel Penolau had been re-surveyed and promoted to Hewitt  status (and by definition, to Simm status). As has Foel Cedig.

Hewitt mountains by height

This list is from the Database of British and Irish Hills ("DoBIH") in October 2018, and are peaks the DoBIH marks as being Grahams ("Hew").  Alan Dawson updates the list of Hewitts from time to time, and the DoBIH also updates their measurements as more surveys are recorded, so these tables should not be amended or updated unless the entire DoBIH data is re-downloaded again.

Bibliography

DoBIH codes

The DoBIH uses the following codes for the various classifications of mountains and hills in the British Isles, which many of the above peaks also fall into:

suffixes:
=	twin

See also

List of mountains of the British Isles by height
Lists of mountains and hills in the British Isles
Lists of mountains in Ireland
List of Munro mountains in Scotland
List of Murdos (mountains)
List of Furth mountains in the British Isles
List of Marilyns in the British Isles
List of P600 mountains in the British Isles

Notes

References

External links
The Database of British and Irish Hills (DoBIH), the largest database of British Isles mountains
Hill Bagging UK & Ireland, the searchable interface for the DoBIH
The Relative Hills of Britain (rhb.org.uk), a website dedicated to mountain and hill classification
Simms: RBH Portal for Alan Dawson's work on Simms (and Hewitts)

Hewitts